Charlie Smith Dannelly (born August 13, 1924) was a Democratic member of the North Carolina General Assembly represented the state's thirty-eighth Senate district between 1995 and 2013. His district includes constituents in Mecklenburg County. A retired educator from Charlotte, North Carolina, Dannelly served several years as Deputy President Pro Tempore of the Senate.

In 2012, Dannelly, then the longest-serving lawmaker representing Mecklenburg County, filed to run for another term but due to his wife's deteriorating health, he dropped out and endorsed another candidate in the Democratic primary, Joel Ford.

Biography
Before entering politics in 1977, Dannelly was a teacher and principal. He served during the Korean War as a first lieutenant in the 82nd Airborne Division. Dannelly made 50 parachute jumps and earned the Korean Service Medal with a Bronze Star.

He served on the Charlotte City Council from 1977 until 1989.

Notes

External links
North Carolina General Assembly - Senator Charlie Smith Dannelly official NC Senate website
Raleigh News & Observer profile
Project Vote Smart - Senator Charlie Smith Dannelly (NC) profile
Follow the Money - Charlie Dannelly
2008 2006 2004 2002 2000 1998  1996 campaign contributions

|-

Johnson C. Smith University alumni
University of North Carolina at Chapel Hill School of Education alumni
Democratic Party North Carolina state senators
1964 births
Living people
21st-century American politicians
People from Bishopville, South Carolina